The Maury Channel is a natural waterway through the central Canadian Arctic Archipelago in Qikiqtaaluk Region, Nunavut. It separates Baillie-Hamilton Island (to the north) from Cornwallis Island (to the south). To the west it opens into Queens Channel and to the east into Wellington Channel.

References

Channels of Qikiqtaaluk Region